The following have served as Master of Trinity Hall, Cambridge:

1350–1355: Robert de Stretton (or Stratton), d.1385
1355–1384: Adam Wickmer (or Walker), d.1384
1384–1413: Robert Braunch (or Branch), d.1413
1413–1429: Henry Wells, d.1431
1429–1443: Marmaduke Lumley, d.1450
1443–1453: Simon Dalling
1453–1471: Simon Thornham
1471–1501: William Dalling
1502–1503: Edward Shouldham, d.1503
1503–1505: Vacant
1505–1512: John Wright, d.1519
1512–1517: Walter Huke (or Hewke), d.1517
1517–1525: Thomas Larke, d.1528
1525–1549: Stephen Gardiner, d.1555
1549–1552: Walter Haddon, d.1572
1552–1553:William Mouse (removed), d.1588
1553–1555: Stephen Gardiner (secundus), d.1555
1555–1559: William Mouse (secundus), d.1588
1559–1585: Henry Harvey, d.1585
1585–1598: Thomas Preston, d.1598
1598–1611: John Cowell, d.1611
1611–1626: Clement Corbet, d.1652
1626–1645: Thomas Eden, d.1645
1645: John Selden, d.1654
1645: Robert King, d.1676
1645–1660: John Bond, d.1676
1660–1676: Robert King (secundus), d.1676
1676–1688: Thomas Exton, d.1688
1688–1702: George Oxenden, d.1703
1703–1710: George Bramston, d.1710
1710–1735 Sir Nathaniel Lloyd, d.1745
1735–1764: Sir Edward Simpson, d.1764
1764–1803: Sir James Marriott, d.1803
1803–1815: Sir William Wynne, d.1815
1815–1843: Thomas Le Blanc, d.1843
1843–1852: Sir Herbert Jenner-Fust, d.1852
1852–1877: Thomas Charles Geldart, d.1877
1877–1888: Sir Henry James Sumner Maine, d.1888
1888–1902: Henry Latham, d.1902
1902–1916: Edward Anthony Beck, d.1916
1916–1919: Vacant
1919–1929: Henry Bond, d.1938
1929–1954: Henry Roy Dean, d.1961
1955–1965: Sir Ivor Jennings, d.1965
1966–1975 William Alexander Deer, d.2009
1975–1986: Sir Theodore Morris Sugden, d.1984
1986–2000: Sir John Lyons, d.2020
2000–2005: Peter Clarke, vivant
2005–2014: Martin Daunton, vivant
2014–2021: Jeremy Morris, vivant
2022–Present: Mary Hockaday

References

Masters
 
Trinity Hall